Athertonia is a monotypic genus of plants in the family Proteaceae. The sole described species is Athertonia diversifolia, commonly known as Atherton oak, athertonia, creamy silky oak or white oak. It is endemic to a small part of the Wet Tropics of Queensland, Australia. A relative of the macadamia, it has potential in horticulture and the bushfood industry.

Description
New shoots and young branches are densely covered in fine rust-coloured hairs. The leaf morphology is highly variable − from a simple elliptic shape to deeply lobed, and they may be with or without finely toothed margins.

The hard, pitted endocarp contains a single seed.

Phenology
Flowering occurs from February to June, and fruit ripen around August to January.

Taxonomy
Athertonia diversifolia was first described in 1918 as Helicia diversifolia by the Queensland Government botanist Cyril Tenison White in his paper Contribution to the Queensland FLora, published in the journal Botany Bulletin. Decades later, in 1955, the Dutch botanist Hermann Otto Sleumer placed it in the genus Hicksbeachia, where it stayed until 1975 when Lawrie Johnson and Barbara Briggs revised the description and created a new genus, Athertonia, for this plant.

Etymology
The genus name is a reference to the Atherton Tablelands, where the type specimen was collected. The species epithet is derived from the Latin words diverto (to differ), and folia (leaf), and refers to the varied leaf morphology it displays.

Vernacular names
The common names "Atherton oak", "silky oak" and "white oak" are given to this species as a reference to the similarity of its leaves to those of the unrelated English oak (Quercus robur).

Distribution and habitat
Athertonia diversifolia is found in north Queensland from the Cape Tribulation area south to the Atherton Tablelands west of Mount Bartle Frere. It grows in rainforest, generally on deep soils of volcanic origin.

Ecology
The kernel contained within the hard endocarp of this species is edible to humans, and is also much sought after by native rats, which often gnaw through the hard shell and eat the kernel while it is still attached to the tree. The flowers attract a variety of nectar-eating birds.

Conservation
Much of the original habitat of the Atherton oak has been cleared, and what is left is highly fragmented. Despite this the species has been given the classification of least concern, by both the Queensland Government Department of Environment and Science (DES), and the International Union for Conservation of Nature (IUCN). Whilst the DES does not publish its procedure or qualification details, the IUCN's assessment states that the population of this species is "locally common and stable", and that the "area, extent and/or quality" of its habitat is not declining.

Uses
The Atherton oak has become widely cultivated, due to its attractive, glossy, lobed foliage, and its low maintenance.

Gallery

References

External links
 
 
 View a map of historical sightings of this species at the Australasian Virtual Herbarium
 View observations of this species on iNaturalist
 View images of this species on Flickriver

Proteaceae
Trees of Australia
Ornamental trees
Endemic flora of Queensland
Plants described in 1918
Proteales of Australia
Monotypic Proteaceae genera
Taxa named by Barbara G. Briggs
Taxa named by Cyril Tenison White
Wet Tropics of Queensland